Hammes is a surname. Notable people with the surname include:

Charles Léon Hammes (1898–1967), Luxembourgian lawyer, judge and the third President of the European Court of Justice
Ernie Hammes (born 1968), Luxembourg trumpeter who specializes in jazz but also plays classical music
George Albert Hammes (1911–1993), the eighth Roman Catholic Bishop of the Diocese of Superior, Wisconsin from 1960 to 1985
Gordon Hammes (born 1934), emeritus professor of biochemistry at Duke University and member of the United States National Academy of Sciences
Hammes Company (or Hammes Co.), healthcare consulting firm
Liselotte Hammes (born 1933), German operatic soprano and academic voice teacher
Thomas Hammes, retired U.S. Marine officer and specialist in counter-insurgency warfare

See also
Hommes